This is a list of holidays in Algeria.

Public holidays

Movable holidays
The following holidays are public holidays but the date on which each occurs varies, according to its corresponding calendar, and thus has no set date. In order in which they occur:

See also
 Ashura in Algeria
 Mawlid in Algeria

 
Algerian culture
Holidays